The Arizona Diamondbacks' 2010 season, the franchise's 13th season in Major League Baseball, included the team's attempt to make the playoffs for the first time since 2007.  On July 1, 2010, the Arizona Diamondbacks fired Manager A. J. Hinch following a 31–48 start to the 2010 season and promoted Kirk Gibson who had served as the bench coach of the team since the 2007 season.  Along with the dismissal of Hinch came the firing of General Manager Josh Byrnes.

Edwin Jackson no-hitter
On June 25, 2010, in a game against the Tampa Bay Rays at Tropicana Field in St. Petersburg, Florida, Diamondbacks right-hander Edwin Jackson threw the second no-hitter in franchise history in a 1–0 victory in front of a crowd of 18,918.  Jackson walked eight Rays batters and struck out six in a 149 pitch outing to complete the game, the only offense he received by his teammates came in the form of a solo home run by first baseman Adam LaRoche in the second inning.

Regular season

Season standings

Record vs. opponents

Game log

|-  bgcolor="ffbbbb"
|- align="center" bgcolor="bbffbb"
| 1 || April 5 || San Diego || 6–3 || Haren (1–0) ||  Garland  (0–1) || None|| 49,192 || 1–0
|- align="center" bgcolor="ffbbbb"
| 2 || April 6 || San Diego || 3–6 || Young (1–0) ||  Jackson  (0–1) || Bell (1) || 19,177 || 1–1
|- align="center" bgcolor="bbffbb"
| 3 || April 7 || San Diego || 5–3 || Boyer (1–0) ||  Correia  (0–1) || Qualls (1) || 17,673 || 2–1
|- align="center" bgcolor="bbffbb"
| 4 || April 9 || Pittsburgh || 9–1 || López (1–0) ||  Morton  (0–1) || None|| 21,316 || 3–1
|- align="center" bgcolor="ffbbbb"
| 5 || April 10 || Pittsburgh || 3–6 || Duke (2–0) ||  Haren  (1–1) || Dotel (1) || 22,400 || 3–2
|- align="center" bgcolor="bbffbb"
| 6 || April 11 || Pittsburgh || 15–6 || Jackson (1–1) ||  McCutchen  (0–1) || None || 21,093 || 4–2
|- align="center" bgcolor="ffbbbb"
| 7 || April 13 || @ Los Angeles || 9–5 || Kershaw (1–0) ||  Kennedy  (0–1) || None || 56,000 || 4–3
|- align="center" bgcolor="bbffbb"
| 8 || April 14 || @ Los Angeles || 7–9 || Rosales (1–0) ||  Ortiz  (0–1) || None || 44,621 || 5–3
|- align="center" bgcolor="ffbbbb"
| 9 || April 15 || @ Los Angeles || 6–5 || Broxton (1–0) ||  Boyer  (1–1) || None || 39,697 || 5–4
|- align="center" bgcolor="ffbbbb"
| 10 || April 16 || @ San Diego || 6–3 || Bell (1–0) ||  Gutiérrez  (0–1) || None || 26,632 || 5–5
|- align="center" bgcolor="ffbbbb"
| 11 || April 17 || @ San Diego || 5–0 || Correia (2–1) ||  Benson  (0–1) || None || 31,324 || 5–6
|- align="center" bgcolor="ffbbbb"
| 12 || April 18 || @ San Diego || 5–3 || Mujica (1–0) ||  Heilman  (0–1) || Bell (3) || 20,634 || 5–7
|- align="center" bgcolor="ffbbbb"
| 13 || April 19 || St. Louis || 2–4 || Penny (2–0) ||  Boyer  (1–2) || Franklin (5) || 24,167 || 5–8
|- align="center" bgcolor="bbffbb"
| 14 || April 20 || St. Louis || 9–7 || Haren (2–1) ||  Boggs  (0–1) || Qualls (2) || 19,855 || 6–8
|- align="center" bgcolor="ffbbbb"
| 15 || April 21 || St. Louis || 4–9 || Motte (1–1) ||  Qualls  (0–1) || None || 19,165 || 6–9
|- align="center" bgcolor="bbffbb"
| 16 || April 23 || Philadelphia || 7–4 || Benson (1–1) ||  Hamels  (2–2) || Qualls (3)  || 25,980 || 7–9
|- align="center" bgcolor="ffbbbb"
| 17 || April 24 || Philadelphia || 2–3 || Contreras (1–1) ||  Gutiérrez  (0–2) || Madson (4)  || 33,323 || 7–10
|- align="center" bgcolor="bbffbb"
| 18 || April 25 || Philadelphia || 8–6 || Rosales (2–0) ||  Herndon  (0–1) || Qualls (4)  || 29,296 || 8–10
|- align="center" bgcolor="bbffbb"
| 19 || April 26 || @ Colorado || 3–5 || Haren (3–1) ||  Hammel  (0–2) || Qualls (5)  || 20,308 || 9–10
|- align="center" bgcolor="ffbbbb"
| 20 || April 27 || @ Colorado || 12–1 || Jiménez (5–0) ||  Jackson  (1–2) || None  || 24,112 || 9–11
|- align="center" bgcolor="bbffbb"
| 21 || April 28 || @ Colorado || 11–12 || Howry (1–0) ||  Morales  (0–2) || Gutiérrez (1)  || 23,773 || 10–11
|- align="center" bgcolor="bbffbb"
| 22 || April 29 || @ Chicago || 5–13 || Kennedy (1–1) ||  Lilly  (1–1) || None  || 36,850 || 11–11
|- align="center" bgcolor="ffbbbb"
| 23 || April 30 || @ Chicago || 11–5 || Wells (3–0) ||  López  (1–1) || None  || 37,800 || 11–12
|-

|-  bgcolor="ffbbbb"
|- align="center" bgcolor="ffbbbb"
| 24 || May 1 || @ Chicago || 7–5 || Marshall (1–1) ||  Gutiérrez  (0–3) || Mármol (4)  || 40,368 || 11–13
|- align="center" bgcolor="ffbbbb"
| 25 || May 2 || @ Chicago || 10–5 || Gorzelanny (1–3) ||  Jackson  (1–3) || None || 38,144 || 11–14
|- align="center" bgcolor="bbffbb"
| 26 || May 3 || @ Houston || 1–9 || Valdez (1–0) ||  Paulino  (0–4) || None || 20,370 || 12–14
|- align="center" bgcolor="bbffbb"
| 27 || May 4 || @ Houston || 0–1 || Kennedy (2–1) ||  Oswalt  (2–4) || Qualls (5) || 22,661 || 13–14
|- align="center" bgcolor="ffbbbb"
| 28 || May 5 || @ Houston || 4–2 || Lindstrom (1–0) ||  Gutiérrez  (0–4) || None || 21,030 || 13–15
|- align="center" bgcolor="bbffbb"
| 29 || May 6 || @ Houston || 3–6 || Haren (4–1) ||  Rodríguez  (1–4) || None || 21,019 || 14–15
|- align="center" bgcolor="ffbbbb"
| 30 || May 7 || Milwaukee || 2–3 || Gallardo (4–2) ||  Jackson  (1–4) || Hoffman (5) || 27,067 || 14–16
|- align="center" bgcolor="ffbbbb"
| 31 || May 8 || Milwaukee || 3–17 || Wolf (3–2) ||  Valdez (1–1) || None || 26,877 || 14–17
|- align="center" bgcolor="ffbbbb"
| 32 || May 9 || Milwaukee || 1–6 || Narveson (3–0) ||  Kennedy  (2–2) || None || 25,358 || 14–18
|- align="center" bgcolor="ffbbbb"
| 33 || May 10 || Los Angeles || 3–7 || Billingsley (3–2) ||  López (1–2) || None || 19,863 || 14–19
|- align="center" bgcolor="ffbbbb"
| 34 || May 11 || Los Angeles || 3–13 || Ely (1–1) ||  Haren (4–2) || None || 21,030 || 14–20
|- align="center" bgcolor="ffbbbb"
| 35 || May 12 || Los Angeles || 3–6 || Kuroda (4–1) ||  Jackson  (1–5) || Broxton (4) || 22,714 || 14–21
|- align="center" bgcolor="ffbbbb"
| 36 || May 14 || @ Atlanta || 6–5 || Wagner (2–0) ||  Qualls  (0–2) || None || 30,657 || 14–22
|- align="center" bgcolor="bbffbb"
| 37 || May 15 || @ Atlanta || 1–11 || López (2–2) ||  Hanson  (3–3) || None || 32,718 || 15–22
|- align="center" bgcolor="ffbbbb"
| 38 || May 16 || @ Atlanta || 13–1 || Hudson (4–1) ||  Haren (4–3) || None || 31,758 || 15–23
|- align="center" bgcolor="bbffbb"
| 39 || May 17 || @ Florida || 1–5 || Jackson  (2–5) ||  Volstad (3–4) || None || 10,870 || 16–23
|- align="center" bgcolor="ffbbbb"
| 40 || May 18 || @ Florida || 8–0 || Johnson  (4–1) ||  Buckner (0–1) || None || 13,289 || 16–24
|- align="center" bgcolor="bbffbb"
| 41 || May 19 || San Francisco || 13–1 || Kennedy  (3–2) ||  Wellemeyer (3–3) || None || 17,073 || 17–24
|- align="center" bgcolor="bbffbb"
| 42 || May 20 || San Francisco || 8–7 || Heilman  (1–1) ||  Affeldt (2–3) || Qualls (7) || 18,607 || 18–24
|- align="center" bgcolor="bbffbb"
| 43 || May 21 || Toronto || 8–6 || Haren (5–3) ||  Morrow (3–4) || Qualls (8) || 19,531 || 19–24
|- align="center" bgcolor="bbffbb"
| 44 || May 22 || Toronto || 8–5 || Jackson  (3–5) ||  Eveland (3–4) || Qualls (9) || 32,746 || 20–24
|- align="center" bgcolor="ffbbbb"
| 45 || May 23 || Toronto || 4–12 || Marcum  (4–1) ||  Buckner (0–2) || None || 23,148 || 20–25
|- align="center" bgcolor="ffbbbb"
| 46 || May 25 || @ Colorado || 3–2 || Chacín  (3–2) ||  Kennedy (3–3) || Corpas (4) || 28,370 || 20–26
|- align="center" bgcolor="ffbbbb"
| 47 || May 26 || @ Colorado || 7–3 || Jiménez  (9–1) ||  López (2–3) || None || 26,320 || 20–27
|- align="center" bgcolor="ffbbbb"
| 48 || May 27 || @ Colorado || 8–2 || Hammel  (2–3) ||  Haren (5–4) || None || 28,353 || 20–28
|- align="center" bgcolor="ffbbbb"
| 49 || May 28 || @ San Francisco || 5–0 || Cain  (3–4) ||  Jackson (3–6) || None || 31,495 || 20–29
|- align="center" bgcolor="ffbbbb"
| 50 || May 29 || @ San Francisco || 12–1 || Sánchez  (3–4) ||  Buckner (0–3) || None || 37,400 || 20–30
|- align="center" bgcolor="ffbbbb"
| 51 || May 30 || @ San Francisco || 6–5 || Wilson  (1–0) ||  Rosa (0–1) || None || 41,394 || 20–31
|- align="center" bgcolor="ffbbbb"
| 52 || May 31 || @ Los Angeles || 5–4 || Broxton  (3–0) ||  Vásquez (0–1) || None || 45,325 || 20–32
|-

|-  bgcolor="ffbbbb"
|- align="center" bgcolor="ffbbbb"
| 53 || June 1 || @ Los Angeles || 1–0 || Weaver  (3–1) ||  Gutiérrez  (0–5) || None || 36,533 || 20–33
|- align="center" bgcolor="ffbbbb"
| 54 || June 2 || @ Los Angeles || 1–0 || Schlichting  (1–0) ||  Valdez  (1–2) || None || 35,355 || 20–34
|- align="center" bgcolor="bbffbb"
| 55 || June 4 || Colorado || 7–6 || Qualls  (1–2) ||  Corpas  (1–3) || None || 25,290 || 21–34
|- align="center" bgcolor="bbffbb"
| 56 || June 5 || Colorado || 4–3 || Willis  (2–2) ||  Chacín  (3–4) || Qualls (10) || 28,138 || 22–34
|- align="center" bgcolor="ffbbbb"
| 57 || June 6 || Colorado || 3–2 || Jiménez (11–1) ||  López  (2–4) || Corpas (6) || 20,793 || 22–35
|- align="center" bgcolor="bbffbb"
| 58 || June 7 || Atlanta || 7–4 || Haren (6–4) ||  Lowe  (8–5) || Qualls (11) || 17,731 || 23–35
|- align="center" bgcolor="ffbbbb"
| 59 || June 8 || Atlanta || 5–7 || Venters (1–0) ||  Vásquez (0–2) || Wagner (10) || 17,052 || 23–36
|- align="center" bgcolor="bbffbb"
| 60 || June 9 || Atlanta || 2–1 || Heilman (2–1) ||  Moylan (2–1) || Qualls (12) || 19,138 || 24–36
|- align="center" bgcolor="ffbbbb"
| 61 || June 10 || Atlanta || 7–11 || Moylan (2–2) ||  Qualls (1–3) || Wagner (11) || 26,969 || 24–37
|- align="center" bgcolor="ffbbbb"
| 62 || June 11 || St. Louis || 2–5 || García (6–2) ||  López (2–5) || Franklin (11) || 20,629 || 24–38
|- align="center" bgcolor="bbffbb"
| 63 || June 12 || St. Louis || 7–2 || Haren (7–4) ||  Ottavino (0–2) || None || 30,017 || 25–38
|- align="center" bgcolor="bbffbb"
| 64 || June 13 || St. Louis || 7–5 || Vásquez (1–2) ||  McClellan (0–2) || None || 23,922 || 26–38
|- align="center" bgcolor="ffbbbb"
| 65 || June 15 || @ Boston || 6–3 || Buchholz (9–4) ||  Kennedy (3–4) || Papelbon (14) || 37,459 || 26–39
|- align="center" bgcolor="ffbbbb"
| 66 || June 16 || @ Boston || 6–2 || Lester (8–2) ||  López (2–6) || Papelbon (15) || 37,452 || 26–40
|- align="center" bgcolor="ffbbbb"
| 67 || June 17 || @ Boston || 8–5 || Lackey (8–3) ||  Haren (7–5) || None || 37,544 || 26–41
|- align="center" bgcolor="ffbbbb"
| 68 || June 18 || @ Detroit || 7–5 || Coke (5–0) ||  Qualls (1–5) || Valverde (15) || 37,438 || 26–42
|- align="center" bgcolor="bbffbb"
| 69 || June 19 || @ Detroit || 5–6 || Jackson (4–6) || Porcello (4–7) || Heilman (1) || 40,681 || 27–42
|- align="center" bgcolor="ffbbbb"
| 70 || June 20 || @ Detroit || 3–1 || Scherzer (4–6) || Kennedy (3–5) || Valverde (16) || 41,417 || 27–43
|- align="center" bgcolor="bbffbb"
| 71 || June 21 || Yankees || 10–4 || López (3–6) || Burnett (6–6) || None || 47,229 || 28–43
|- align="center" bgcolor="ffbbbb"
| 72 || June 22 || Yankees || 3–9 || Pettitte (9–2) || Haren (7–6) || None || 45,776 || 28–44
|- align="center" bgcolor="ffbbbb"
| 73 || June 23 || Yankees || 5–6 || Rivera (1–1) || Rosa (0–2) || None || 46,325 || 28–45
|- align="center" bgcolor="bbffbb"
| 74 || June 25 || @ Tampa Bay || 0–1 || Jackson (5–6) No-Hitter || Niemann (6–2) || None || 18,918 || 29–45
|- align="center" bgcolor="ffbbbb"
| 75 || June 26 || @ Tampa Bay || 5–3 || Price (11–3) || Kennedy (3–6) || Soriano (18) || 23,945 || 29–46
|- align="center" bgcolor="bbffbb"
| 76 || June 27 || @ Tampa Bay || 1–2 || López (4–6) || Davis (5–9) || Heilman (2) || 25,442 || 30–46
|- align="center" bgcolor="ffbbbb"
| 77 || June 28 || @ St. Louis || 6–5 || Motte (3–2) || Heilman (2–2) || None || 41,578 || 30–47
|- align="center" bgcolor="ffbbbb"
| 78 || June 29 || @ St. Louis || 8–0 || Wainwright (11–5) || Willis (2–3) || None || 38,736 || 30–48
|- align="center" bgcolor="bbffbb"
| 79 || June 30 || @ St. Louis || 2–4 || Enright (1–0) || Suppan (0–4) || Heilman (3) || 36,962 || 31–48
|-

|-  bgcolor="ffbbbb"
|- align="center" bgcolor="bbffbb"
| 80 || July 2 || Los Angeles || 12–5 || Jackson (6–6) || Kuroda (7–6) || None || 23,115 || 32–48
|- align="center" bgcolor="ffbbbb"
| 81 || July 3 || Los Angeles || 1–14 || Kershaw (8–4) || López (4–7) || None || 44,169 || 32–49
|- align="center" bgcolor="ffbbbb"
| 82 || July 4 || Los Angeles || 1–3 || Kuo (3–1) || Heilman (2–3) || Broxton (17) || 26,517 || 32–50
|- align="center" bgcolor="ffbbbb"
| 83 || July 5 || Chicago || 4–9 || Gorzelanny (3–5) || Kennedy (3–7) || None || 26,250 || 32–51
|- align="center" bgcolor="ffbbbb"
| 84 || July 6 || Chicago || 4–6 || Silva (9–2) || Enright (1–1) || Mármol (16) || 20,067 || 32–52
|- align="center" bgcolor="ffbbbb"
| 85 || July 7 || Chicago || 3–8 || Dempster (7–7)|| Jackson (6–7) || None || 20,914 || 32–53
|- align="center" bgcolor="bbffbb"
| 86 || July 8 || Florida || 10–4 || López (5–7) || Sánchez (7–6) || None || 16,664 || 33–53
|- align="center" bgcolor="ffbbbb"
| 87 || July 9 || Florida || 2–3 || Nolasco (9–6) || Haren (7–7) || Núñez (19) || 18,117 || 33–54
|- align="center" bgcolor="bbffbb"
| 88 || July 10 || Florida || 5–4 || Kennedy (4–7) || Robertson (6–7) || Gutiérrez  (2) || 21,627 || 34–54
|- align="center" bgcolor="ffbbbb"
| 89 || July 11 || Florida || 0–2 || Badenhop (1–5) || Enright (1–2) || Núñez (20) || 21,037 || 34–55
|- align="center" bgcolor="ffbbbb"
| 90 || July 16 || @ San Diego || 12–1 || Garland  (9–6) || Haren (7–8) || None || 33,177 || 34–56
|- align="center" bgcolor="ffbbbb"
| 91 || July 17 || @ San Diego || 8–5 || Richard (7–4) || López (5–8) || Bell (25) || 40,011 || 34–57
|- align="center" bgcolor="ffbbbb"
| 92 || July 18 || @ San Diego || 6–4 || Correia (6–6) || Jackson  (6–8) || Bell (26) || 25,363 || 34–58
|- align="center" bgcolor="bbffbb"
| 93 || July 19 || Mets || 13–2 || Kennedy  (5–7) || Pelfrey (10–5) || None || 18,253 || 35–58
|- align="center" bgcolor="bbffbb"
| 94 || July 20 || Mets || 3–2 || Enright (2–2) || Dickey (6–4) || Gutiérrez  (3) || 18,749 || 36–58
|- align="center" bgcolor="bbffbb"
| 95 || July 21 || Mets || 4–3 || Boyer (2–2) || Nieve (0–0) || None || 18,223 || 37–58
|- align="center" bgcolor="ffbbbb"
| 96 || July 22 || San Francisco || 0–3 || Cain  (8–8) || López (5–9) || Wilson (27) || 17,230 || 37–59
|- align="center" bgcolor="ffbbbb"
| 97 || July 23 || San Francisco || 4–7 || Ray (3–0) || Jackson  (6–9) || Wilson (28) || 22,512 || 37–60
|- align="center" bgcolor="ffbbbb"
| 98 || July 24 || San Francisco || 4–10 || Bumgarner (4–2) || Kennedy  (5–8) || None || 32,774 || 37–61
|- align="center" bgcolor="ffbbbb"
| 99 || July 25 || San Francisco || 2–3 || Romo (3–3) || Vásquez (1–3) || Wilson (29) || 31,278 || 37–62
|- align="center" bgcolor="ffbbbb"
| 100 || July 27 || @ Philadelphia || 9–5 || Herndon (1–2) || Norberto (0–2) || None || 44,379 || 37–63
|- align="center" bgcolor="ffbbbb"
| 101 || July 28 || @ Philadelphia || 7–1 || Halladay (12–8) || Jackson (6–10) || None || 45,048 || 37–64
|- align="center" bgcolor="ffbbbb"
| 102 || July 29 || @ Philadelphia || 3–2 || Contreras (5–3) || Vásquez (1–4) || None || 45,232 || 37–65
|- align="center" bgcolor="bbffbb"
| 103 || July 30 || @ Mets || 6–9 || Kennedy  (6–8) || Valdés (2–3) || Heilman (4) || 34,280 || 38–65
|- align="center" bgcolor="ffbbbb"
| 104 || July 31 || @ Mets || 5–4 || Rodríguez (4–2)|| Gutiérrez 0–6 || None || 35,287 || 38–66
|-

|-  bgcolor="ffbbbb"
|- align="center" bgcolor="bbffbb"
| 105 || August 1 || @ Mets || 1–14 || Hudson (2–1) || Niese (7–5) || None || 35,014 || 39–66
|- align="center" bgcolor="ffbbbb"
| 106 || August 2 || Washington || 1–3 || Hernández (8–7) || López (5–10) || Burnett (1) || 16,793 || 39–67
|- align="center" bgcolor="bbffbb"
| 107 || August 3 || Washington || 6–1 || Saunders (7–10) || Olsen (3–3) || None || 17,164|| 40–67
|- align="center" bgcolor="ffbbbb"
| 108 || August 4 || Washington || 2–7 || Stammen (4–4) || Kennedy  (6–9) || None || 15,670 || 40–68
|- align="center" bgcolor="bbffbb"
| 109 || August 5 || Washington || 8–4 || Enright (3–2) || Detwiler (0–2) || None || 16,638 || 41–68
|- align="center" bgcolor="bbffbb"
| 110 || August 6 || San Diego || 2–1 || Hudson (3–1) || Garland  (10–8) || Heilman (5) || 22,168 || 42–68
|- align="center" bgcolor="bbffbb"
| 111 || August 7 || San Diego || 6–5 || Heilman (3–3) || Gregerson (3–6) || None || 48,946 || 43–68
|- align="center" bgcolor="ffbbbb"
| 112 || August 8 || San Diego || 1–10 || Latos (12–5) || Saunders (7–11) || None || 27,856 || 43–69
|- align="center" bgcolor="bbffbb"
| 113 || August 9 || @ Milwaukee || 4–7 || Demel (1–0) || Hoffman (2–5) || Heilman (6) || 29,633 || 44–69
|- align="center" bgcolor="bbffbb"
| 114 || August 10 || @Milwaukee || 1–2 || Boyer (3–2) || Capuano (1–2) || Demel (1) || 35,029 || 45–69
|- align="center" bgcolor="bbffbb"
| 115 || August 11 || @ Milwaukee || 2–8 || Hudson (4–1) || Bush (5–10) || None || 29,611 || 46–69
|- align="center" bgcolor="ffbbbb"
| 116 || August 12 || @ Milwaukee || 8–4 || Wolf (9–9) || López (5–11) || Axford (17) || 34,808 || 46–70
|- align="center" bgcolor="ffbbbb"
| 117 || August 13 || @ Washington || 4–2 || Lannan (4–5) || Saunders (7–12) || Burnett (2) || 19,549 || 46–71
|- align="center" bgcolor="bbffbb"
| 118 || August 14 || @ Washington || 2–9 || Kennedy  (7–9) || Marquis (0–5) || None || 22,400 || 47–71
|- align="center" bgcolor="ffbbbb"
| 119 || August 15 || @ Washington || 5–3 || Clippard (9–6) || Norberto (0–2) || Storen (2) || 21,695 || 47–72
|- align="center" bgcolor="ffbbbb"
| 120 || August 17 || Cincinnati || 2–6 || Arroyo (13–7) || Hudson (4–2) || None || 21,502 || 47–73
|- align="center" bgcolor="ffbbbb"
| 121 || August 18 || Cincinnati || 7–11 || Rhodes (4–3) || Heilman (3–4) || None || 15,509 || 47–74
|- align="center" bgcolor="ffbbbb"
| 122 || August 19 || Cincinnati || 5–9 || Wood (4–1) || Saunders (7–13) || None || 17,385 || 47–75
|- align="center" bgcolor="bbffbb"
| 123 || August 20 || Colorado || 4–3 || Heilman (4–4) || Beimel (1–2) || None || 26,294 || 48–75
|- align="center" bgcolor="bbffbb"
| 124 || August 21 || Colorado || 3–1 || Enright (3–2) || Jiménez (17–4) || Gutiérrez  (4) || 37,631 || 49–75
|- align="center" bgcolor="ffbbbb"
| 125 || August 22 || Colorado || 0–1 || Chacín (6–9) || Heilman (4–5) || Street (10) || 30,397 || 49–76
|- align="center" bgcolor="ffbbbb"
| 126 || August 24 || @ San Diego || 5–0 || Richard (12–5) || López (5–12) || None || 20,075 || 49–77
|- align="center" bgcolor="ffbbbb"
| 127 || August 25 || @ San Diego || 9–3 || LeBlanc (8–11) || Saunders (7–14) || None || 21,966 || 49–78
|- align="center" bgcolor="bbffbb"
| 128 || August 26 || @ San Diego || 5–11 || Kennedy (8–9) || Correia (10–9) || None || 20,983 || 50–78
|- align="center" bgcolor="bbffbb"
| 129 || August 27 || @ San Francisco || 0–6 || Enright (5–2) || Lincecum (10–9) || None || 38,013 || 51–78
|- align="center" bgcolor="bbffbb"
| 130 || August 28 || @ San Francisco || 3–11 || Hudson (5–2) || Zito (8–10) || None || 41,250 || 52–78
|- align="center" bgcolor="ffbbbb"
| 131 || August 29 || @ San Francisco || 9–7 || Affeldt (3–3) || Vásquez (1–5) || Wilson (36) || 38,735 || 52–79
|- align="center" bgcolor="bbffbb"
| 132 || August 30 || San Diego || 7–2 || Saunders (8–14) || LeBlanc (8–12) || None || 17,829 || 53–79
|- align="center" bgcolor="bbffbb"
| 133 || August 31 || San Diego || 7–4 || Kennedy (9–9) || Correia (10–10) || Gutiérrez (5) || 16,250 || 54–79
|-

|-  bgcolor="ffbbbb"
|- align="center" bgcolor=bbffbb
| 134 || September 1 || San Diego || 5–2 || Enright (6–2)|| Gregerson (3–7)|| Gutiérrez (6)|| 17,606|| 55–79
|- align="center" bgcolor=bbffbb
| 135 || September 3 || Houston || 4–3|| Heilman (5–5)|| López (5–1)|| Gutiérrez (7)|| 24,764 || 56–79
|- align="center" bgcolor=ffbbbb
| 136 || September 4 || Houston || 5–6 || Melancon (2–0)|| Heilman (5–6) || Lyon (12)|| 31,621 || 56–80
|- align="center" bgcolor=ffbbbb
| 137 || September 5 || Houston || 2–3 || Happ (6–2) || López (5–13)|| Lyon (13) || 25,449 || 56–81
|- align="center" bgcolor=ffbbbb
| 138 || September 6 || San Francisco || 0–2 || Casilla (6–2)|| Heilman (5–7)|| Wilson (41)|| 31,904 || 56–82
|- align="center" bgcolor=ffbbbb
| 139 || September 7 || San Francisco || 3–6 || Lincecum (13–9) || Enright (6–3) || Affeldt (4)|| 19,423 || 56–83
|- align="center" bgcolor=bbffbb
| 140 || September 8 || San Francisco || 3–1 || Hudson (5–1) || Zito (8–12) || Gutiérrez (8) || 19,971 || 57–83
|- align="center" bgcolor=ffbbbb
| 141 || September 10 || @ Colorado || 13–4 || de la Rosa (7–4) || Saunders (2–5) || None || 37,265 || 57–84
|- align="center" bgcolor=ffbbbb
| 142 || September 11 || @ Colorado || 2–1 || Reynolds (1–0) || López (5–14) || Street (18) || 48,023 || 57–85
|- align="center" bgcolor=ffbbbb
| 143 || September 12 || @ Colorado || 4–2 || Street (3–4) || Demel (1–1) || None || 41,504 || 57–86
|- align="center" bgcolor=ffbbbb
| 144 || September 13 || @ Cincinnati || 7–2 || Arroyo (15–10) || Enright (6–4) || None || 12,060 || 57–87
|- align="center" bgcolor=bbffbb
| 145 || September 14 || @ Cincinnati || 1–3 || Hudson (6–1) || Wood (5–3)|| Gutiérrez (9) || 16,973|| 58–87
|- align="center" bgcolor=ffbbbb
| 146 || September 15 || @ Cincinnati || 7–5 || Maloney (1–2) || Saunders (2–6)|| Cordero (36) || 19,923 || 58–88
|- align="center" bgcolor=bbffbb
| 147 || September 16 || @ Cincinnati || 1–3 || López (6–14) || Vólquez (3–3) || Gutiérrez (10) || 22,090 || 59–88
|- align="center" bgcolor=ffbbbb
| 148 || September 17 || @ Pittsburgh || 4–3 || Meek (5–4) || Vásquez (1–6) || None || 22,939 || 59–89
|- align="center" bgcolor=ffbbbb
| 149 || September 18 || @ Pittsburgh || 9–6 || McDonald (4–5) || Enright (6–5) || None || 25,981 || 59–90
|- align="center" bgcolor=ffbbbb
| 150 || September 19 || @ Pittsburgh || 4–3 || Hanrahan (4–1) || Heilman (5–8) || Meek (3) || 18,331 || 59–91
|- align="center" bgcolor=bbffbb
| 151 || September 21 || Colorado || 3–1 || Saunders (3–6) || de la Rosa (8–5) || Gutiérrez (11) || 37,461 || 60–91
|- align="center" bgcolor=bbffbb
| 152 || September 22 || Colorado || 8–4 || López (7–14) || Jiménez (19–7) || Demel (2) || 29,916 || 61–91
|- align="center" bgcolor=bbffbb
| 153 || September 23 || Colorado || 10–9 || Carrasco (3–2) || Francis (4–6) || Gutiérrez (12) || 30,090 || 62–91
|- align="center" bgcolor=ffbbbb
| 154 || September 24 || Los Angeles || 1–3 || Kershaw (13–10) || Enright (6–6) || Jansen (2) || 38,567 || 62–92
|- align="center" bgcolor=bbffbb
| 155 || September 25 || Los Angeles || 5–2 || Hudson (7–1) || Ely (4–9) || Gutiérrez (13) || 41,403 || 63–92
|- align="center" bgcolor=bbffbb
| 156 || September 26 || Los Angeles || 5–4 || Demel (2–1) || Broxton (5–6) || Gutiérrez (14) || 38,178 || 64–92
|- align="center" bgcolor=ffbbbb
| 157 || September 28 || @ San Francisco || 4–2 || Sánchez (12–9) || López (7–15) || Wilson (46) || 37,449 || 64–93
|- align="center" bgcolor=ffbbbb
| 158 || September 29 || @ San Francisco || 3–1 || Lincecum (16–10) || Kennedy (9–10) || Wilson (47) || 38,228 || 64–94
|- align="center" bgcolor=ffbbbb
| 159 || September 30 || @ San Francisco || 4–1 || Bumgarner (7–6) || Enright (6–7) || Ramírez (1) || 37,261 || 64–95
|-

|-  bgcolor="ffbbbb"
|- align="center" bgcolor=bbffbb
| 160 || October 1 || @ Los Angeles || 5–7 || Kroenke (1–0) || Ely (4–10) || Gutiérrez (15) || 36,713 || 65–95
|- align="center" bgcolor=ffbbbb
| 161 || October 2 || @ Los Angeles || 3–2 || Billingsley (12–11) || Saunders (3–7) || Jansen (4) || 41,918 || 65–96
|- align="center" bgcolor=ffbbbb
| 162 || October 3 || @ Los Angeles || 3–1 || Lilly (10–12) || López (7–16) || Kuo (12) || 38,007 || 65–97
|-

Roster

Player stats

Batting
Note: G = Games played; AB = At bats; R = Runs scored; H = Hits; 2B = Doubles; 3B = Triples; HR = Home runs; RBI = Runs batted in; AVG = Batting average; SB = Stolen bases

Starters by position noted with an asterisk.

Pitching
Note: W = Wins; L = Losses; ERA = Earned run average; G = Games pitched; GS = Games started; SV = Saves; IP = Innings pitched; R = Runs allowed; ER = Earned runs allowed; BB = Walks allowed; K = Strikeouts

Farm system

References

External links

 2010 Arizona Diamondbacks season at Baseball Reference
 2010 Arizona Diamondbacks season Official Site

Arizona Diamondbacks seasons
Arizona Diamondbacks
Arizonia